STS-105 was a mission of the Space Shuttle Discovery to the International Space Station, launched from Kennedy Space Center, Florida, 10 August 2001. This mission was Discovery's final mission until STS-114, because Discovery was grounded for a refit, and then all Shuttles were grounded in the wake of the Columbia disaster. The refit included an update of the flight deck to the glass cockpit layout, which was already installed on Atlantis and Columbia.

Crew

Space walks
 Barry and Forrester – EVA 1
 EVA 1 Start: 16 August 2001 – 13:58 UTC
 EVA 1 End: 16 August 2001 – 20:14 UTC
 Duration: 6 hours, 16 minutes
 Barry and Forrester – EVA 2
 EVA 2 Start: 18 August 2001 – 13:42 UTC
 EVA 2 End: 18 August 2001 – 19:11 UTC
 Duration: 5 hours, 29 minutes

Mission highlights

The main purpose of STS-105 was the rotation of the International Space Station crew and the delivery of supplies utilizing the Italian-built Multi Purpose Logistics Module (MPLM) Leonardo on its second flight (STS-102, STS-105). The crew also performed two spacewalks and conducted scientific experiments. The Multi Purpose Logistics Module (MPLM) taken on STS-105 contained additional scientific racks, equipment and supplies. An identical module named Raffaello has flown twice (STS-100 and, later, STS-108).

Aboard Leonardo were six Resupply Stowage Racks, four Resupply Stowage Platforms, and two new scientific experiment racks for the station's U.S. laboratory Destiny. The two new science racks (EXPRESS Racks 4 and 5) added further science capability to the station. EXPRESS stands for Expedite the Processing of Experiments to the Space Station. EXPRESS Rack 4 weighs  and EXPRESS Rack 5 weighs . EXPRESS Racks 1 and 2A were delivered aboard the Raffaello cargo module during STS-100/6A in April 2001. EXPRESS Rack 3 was brought to the station during STS-111 in 2002. The racks were manufactured at the Space Station Processing Facility.

The Resupply Stowage Racks and Resupply Stowage Platforms were filled with Cargo Transfer Bags that contain equipment and supplies for the station.

Also carried in the payload bay was an Integrated Cargo Carrier (ICC) carrying the Early Ammonia Servicer and MISSE PECs 1 & 2.

Another payload on board is the Materials International Space Station Experiments (MISSE). This project was a NASA/Langley Research Center-managed cooperative endeavor to fly materials and other types of space exposure experiments on the space station. The objective was to develop early, low-cost, non-intrusive opportunities to conduct critical space exposure tests of space materials and components planned for use on future spacecraft. Johnson Space Center, Marshall Space Flight Center, Glenn Research Center, the Materials Laboratory at the Air Force Research Laboratory and Boeing Phantom Works were participants with Langley in the project. The MISSE experiments were the first externally mounted experiments conducted on the ISS. The experiments were in four Passive Experiment Containers (PECs) that were initially developed and used for an experiment on Mir in 1996 during the Shuttle-Mir Program. The PECs were transported to Mir on STS-76. After an 18-month exposure in space, they were retrieved on STS-86. PECs are suitcase-like containers for transporting experiments via the space shuttle to and from an orbiting spacecraft. Once on orbit and clamped to the host spacecraft, the PECs are opened and serve as racks to expose experiments to the space environment.

Other payloads on board were part of the Goddard Space Flight Center's Wallops Flight Facility Shuttle Small Payloads Project. The SSPP system utilizes payload carrier systems such as the Hitchhiker, Getaway Specials and Space Experiment Modules to provide a low cost scientific research environment. SSPP payloads on STS-105 include the Hitchhiker payload Simplesat, The Cell Growth in Microgravity GAS Canister (G-708), the Microgravity Smoldering Combustion experiment (MSC), and the Hitchhiker Experiment Advancing Technology Space Experiment Module-10 payload).

This was the only Shuttle launch to go before the scheduled launch time, at the beginning, rather than the optimal middle or later, of the 10-minute launch window to rendezvous with ISS.  It launched early because an approaching storm system threatened to violate launch criteria at the appointed time.

Wake-up calls 
NASA began a tradition of playing music to astronauts during the Gemini program, which was first used to wake up a flight crew during Apollo 15.
Each track is specially chosen, often by their families, and usually has a special meaning to an individual member of the crew, or is applicable to their daily activities.

Media

See also

List of human spaceflights
List of International Space Station spacewalks
List of Space Shuttle missions
List of spacewalks and moonwalks 1965–1999
Outline of space science

References

External links
 NASA mission summary 
 STS-105 Video Highlights 

Space Shuttle missions
Spacecraft launched in 2001
Articles containing video clips